Marc Rebés Ruiz (born 3 July 1994) is an Andorran professional footballer who plays as a centre-back and midfielder for Primera Divisió club FC Santa Coloma and the Andorra national team.

International career
Rebés made his international debut on 6 June 2015 in a friendly against Equatorial Guinea. On 9 June 2017 Rebés scored his first international goal in a 1–0 victory over Hungary in 2018 FIFA World Cup qualifying. The game-winning goal provided Andorra with its first competitive victory in 66 matches spanning nearly 13 years, and its second competitive victory overall.

International goals
Last updated on 14 November 2020. Scores and results list Andorra's goal tally first.

References

External links

1994 births
Living people
Andorran footballers
Andorra international footballers
Association football central defenders
Association football midfielders
FC Santa Coloma players
Stade Beaucairois players
UE Santa Coloma players
Andorran expatriate footballers
Expatriate footballers in France
Andorran expatriate sportspeople in France